The 1925 Cleveland Bulldogs season was their third in the league. The team failed to improve on their previous output of 7–1–1, winning only five league games. They finished twelfth in the league. The team also played in the first Wednesday game in league history, a 22–13 loss to the Detroit Panthers.

Schedule

 Games in italics are against non-NFL teams.

Standings

References

Cleveland Bulldogs seasons
Cleveland Bulldogs
Cleveland Bulldogs